The Central Guard Corps (The People's Liberation Army 61889 Corps) is a military protective service agency under the Central Military Commission charged with protecting Chinese political leaders, their families, and visiting heads of state or government.

The Central Guard Corps has used multiple military unit cover designators. It was known as the 8341 Corps during Mao Zedong's era, the 57003 Corps in 1976–2000, and the 61889 Corps after 2000.

History

First formation
During much of the 1930s the Chinese Communist Party's main internal security organization was the State Political Security Bureau (SPSB). It was created after Mao Zedong was dismissed as general political commissar
of the First Front Army in November 1931. The SPSB was created by absorbing existing organizations, taking over protection of senior CCP members and the secret police roles. The SPSB included a Political Security Regiment and two Brigades of State Political Security for protection duties.

After effectively assuming party leadership after 1935 Zunyi Conference, Mao worked to wrestle control of the security apparatus from the party by undermining the SPSB; SPSB forces were reduced, and Mao's supporters moved into party and SPSB leadership positions. In 1938, Mao created a new security unit, the Central Guard Training Brigade (CGTB). The CGTB was formally commanded by three non-SPSB organizations and was organizationally subordinated to a fourth, the Central Revolutionary Military Committee; Mao chaired the committee and, through it, controlled the brigade.

In October 1942, the CGTB was expanded into the Central Guard Regiment. At the end of the Second World War, a third of the Central Guard Corps was split off to create a protection unit for the CCP advance into Manchuria. In the following continuation of the Chinese Civil War, the Central Guard Corps protected the Central Committee and PLA Headquarters. Mao exerted indirect control through Wang Dongxing, head of the Guard Bureau under the Central Secretariat.

The CCP's forces were reorganized in July 1949 with the security component becoming the Ministry of Public Security's (MPS) Chinese People's Public Security Forces (CPPSF), being renamed as the PLA Public Security Forces (PLAPSF) in September 1950. The Central Column of the CPPSF was created in August 1949 to protect the new capital of Beijing and the party leadership; in September 1949 the Central Guard Corps was expanded into the 2nd Division of the Central Column. The reorganization was part of an effort to professionalize Chinese security forces by Nie Rongzhen and Luo Ruiqing, but it removed the Central Guard Corps from Mao's influence and reduced Mao's influence in security; Luo was Minister of Public Security. Nie and Luo subsequently had poorer relationships with Mao.

Second formation 
Mao created a new Central Guard Corps in May 1953. The Central Guard Corps was separating from the PLAPSF and subordinated to the party's CGB. Wang, leading the CGB, was again Mao's conduit of control. The PLA formally controlled the Central Guard Corps, but in practice it only provided logistical and recruitment support. Similarly, while the CGB was simultaneously the MPS's 9th Bureau, in practice the MPS exercised no control. Therefore, Mao appointed commanders, and set recruiting criteria that favored poor or lower-middle-class peasants.

In 1959, Minister of National Defense Peng Dehuai, acting on a poor relationship with Mao, attempted to remove the Central Guard Corps from Mao's control by subordinating it to the Beijing Garrison Command (BGC). It was unsuccessful because the Central Guard Corps only drew logistical support. Peng was subsequently purged at the 1959 Lushan Conference, and the Central Guard Corps was resubordinated to the PLA GSD in 1960. The PLA commanded the Central Guard Corps for a few years while Wang attended the Central Party School and served as Jiangxi's deputy governor.

Mao strengthened his control over security in preparation for the Cultural Revolution, which included placing Wang in greater positions of authority. In September 1960, Wang was transferred back to Beijing to lead a purge of the CGB and Central Guard Corps; in April 1964, he took over the MPS' 9th Bureau and managed its merger with the 8th Bureau which saw opponents dismissed. On the eve of the Cultural Revolution, Mao directly controlled the CGB, and through it the Central Guard Corps and BGC, which he used to arrest and spy on his opponents. Mao fostered the Central Guard Corps's loyalty by providing social and economic assistance to its members and their families, and - before 1969 - personally meeting new recruits.

The Cultural Revolution
During the Cultural Revolution, the Central Guard Corps acted as Mao's representatives and communication intermediaries. Central Guard Corps units were stationed to restore order at the "six factories and two universities" in Beijing which Mao regarded as "models". The Central Guard Corps's prestige, derived from their close association with Mao, allowed their mere presence to pacify the mass rebels; Zhou Enlai sent officials to shelter in areas under Central Guard Corps influence. The Central Guard Corps and CGB established close ties with various politicians and groups, including Lin Biao, seeking to ensure their access to Mao; Mao proceeded to "rectify" the loyalty of his security force after coming into conflict with Lin at the 1970 Lushan plenum.

Mao's death in September 1976 instigated a power struggle within the CCP between the radical Gang of Four and the moderates. Wang was the most powerful person in the party's security and intelligence organization and retained control of the Central Guard Corps and CGB; he adhered to Mao's views and allied with the moderates, allowing the moderates to control the party's elite security forces: the BGC, Central Guard Corps and CGB. The Gang of Four were suppressed in October 1976; the Central Guard Corps arrested the Gang, and the BGC arrested followers and took over the media.

The Central Guard Corps was reorganized into the Central Guard Division in 1977.

Leadership changes after Mao

Deng Xiaoping returned to office in 1977 and moved to assert control over the security apparatus. At the Third Plenum of the 11th party congress in December 1978, Wang agreed to relinquish control over the CGO, CGB, and Central Guard Corps for a mostly symbolic party vice chairmanship; Wang had previously refused to ally with Deng. Sun Yong, Deng's chief bodyguard and possibly one of Wang's old political rivals, became the Central Guard Corps's new commander. In addition, the Third Plenum reduced the influence of Wang and his supporters by separating the CGB and Central Guard Corps from the CGO; this put party security forces solely under the control of the Deng-controlled PLA GSD. Finally, the CGO, CGB, and Central Guard Corps were purged of Wang's supporters.

Notes

References

Citations

Sources 

 
 

Land forces units and formations of the People's Republic of China
Guards regiments